The 1860 United States presidential election in New Jersey took place on 6 November 1860, as part of the 1860 United States presidential election. Voters in New Jersey chose seven electors of the Electoral College, who voted for President and Vice President. New Jersey voters voted for each elector individually, and thus could split their votes. All seven electors were chosen in a single at-large election. That is, each voter voted for up to seven candidates, and the seven candidates with highest vote counts were elected.

The state's seven electoral votes were split, with Republican candidate Abraham Lincoln getting four, while Democrat Stephen A. Douglas won 3. That was because the Democratic electors were part of a fusion ticket between the regular Democrats, supporting Douglas, breakaway Democrats, supporting John C. Breckinridge, and the Constitutional Union Party, former Whigs supporting John Bell.

The fusion ticket was formed because none of the three factions thought that it could defeat the Republicans separately, but their combined votes could do so, and then, each group would get some electoral votes. Several different slates were proposed. The final fusion ticket consisted of three electors pledged to Douglas, two pledged to Breckinridge, and two pledged to Bell.

However, many Douglas Democrats resented the concession to the Breckinridge and Bell factions and believed that the Breckinridge and Bell voters were much fewer and that Douglas could carry the state if all opponents of Lincoln supported him. That group formed a slate of seven Douglas Democrats, which included the three on the fusion ticket. 

At the time, election authorities did not issue pre-printed ballots with all candidates' names, to be marked by voters. Instead, each voter wrote his votes down on a piece of paper or used a pre-printed ballot distributed by a political party or faction that had only the names of that group's candidates. The voter could modify a pre-printed ballot by crossing off or writing over one or more of the printed names. The state Democrats issued a pre-printed ballot with the seven fusion candidates; the dissident Democrats issued a ballot with the all-Douglas slate.

In the election, about 58,200 fusion ticket ballots were cast, about 4,600 straight-Democrat ballots, and about 58,300 Republican ballots.
 The exact numbers cannot be determined, as some voters altered their pre-printed ballots or cast hand-written ballots. It appears that the names of some of the Breckinridge or Bell electors were crossed off or replaced by 400 to 2,000 fusion-ticket voters. The three Douglas candidates who were on both the fusion and straight-Democrat tickets got over 62,000 votes, the seven Republican candidates all got about 58,300 votes, and the four non-Douglas candidates on the fusion ticket got 58,200 or less. Thus, three Douglas candidates and four Lincoln candidates were elected.

New Jersey was one of four states in 1860 on which the Democrats formed a fusion ticket. The other three states were New York, Pennsylvania, and Rhode Island. This is the only time a Republican won the election without Cape May County.

Results

See also
 United States presidential elections in New Jersey

Elected electors names in boldface. Fusion electors Cook, Parker, and Runyon were pledged to Douglas and voted for him.

Notes

References

1860 New Jersey elections
1860
New Jersey